Geneva Downtown Commercial Historic District is a national historic district located at Geneva, Adams County, Indiana, USA. It encompasses 22 contributing buildings in the central business district of Geneva.  were built between about 1882 and 1930, and include notable examples of Italianate and Romanesque Revival style commercial architecture.  Notable buildings include the M.E. Hutton Carriage Shop (1895-1896), Briggs Hardware (1882), Shamrock Block (c. 1885), and the Independent Order of Odd Fellows building (1906).

It was listed on the National Register of Historic Places in 2002.

References

Historic districts on the National Register of Historic Places in Indiana
Commercial buildings on the National Register of Historic Places in Indiana
Italianate architecture in Indiana
Romanesque Revival architecture in Indiana
Buildings and structures in Adams County, Indiana
National Register of Historic Places in Adams County, Indiana